"The New Anthem" is a 1992 song recorded by the American music project Reel 2 Real featuring Erick "More" Morillo, which marked the act's first number-one single on Billboard's Dance Club Songs Chart. The single was written and produced by Morillo and Ralphie "Boy" Muniz. The single features two versions: The A side was listed as the "Funky Budda Side." The B side was the "Just Say No Side."

Track listings
 12 inch (US)
A1   "The New Anthem (Funky Budda Mix)" (5:40) 
A2   "The New Anthem (Funky Budda Instrumental)" (5:40) 
A3   "The New Anthem (Budda Anthem)" (0:40)
B1   "The New Anthem (Not So Radio Mix)"  (3:29)
B2   "The New Anthem (Union City Mix)" (5:08)
B3   "The New Anthem (Union City Instrumental)" (4:13)

Charts

References

External links
Union City Radio edit of "The New Anthem" on YouTube
Funky Budda Mix of "The New Anthem" on YouTube

1992 songs
1992 debut singles
Reel 2 Real songs
House music songs
Songs written by Erick Morillo
Strictly Rhythm singles